Salaam Kashmier is a 2014 Indian Malayalam-language action drama film directed by Joshiy, produced by Mahaa Subair and scripted by Sethu. The film stars Jayaram, Suresh Gopi and Miya alongside Junaid Sheikh, Lalu Alex, Vijayaraghavan and Krishna Kumar.  While the lead performances were praised, especially those of Suresh Gopi and Jayaram, the film were heavily criticised for its shoddy making, especially the background scores and illogical script.The film was a huge flop at the box office.

Plot
The film's storyline revolves around two men: Tomy Eeppan Devassy and Sreekumar. Sreekumar, a character who does all the domestic work expected from a wife in normal course. Into this peaceful world enters Tomy disrupting the domestic bliss and bringing out an unexpected twist. With his arrival everything goes haywire in Sreekumar's life and he reaches a position where he can no longer be with his family. The film unravels the mysterious past of both the characters finding the cause behind their unusual demeanor.

Cast

Production
The film marks the comeback of Suresh Gopi after a hiatus of two years. He plays the role of a typical Nasrani from Pala, Kottayam.

Soundtrack

Track listing

References

External links
 

2014 films
2010s Malayalam-language films
Indian action drama films
Indian Army in films
Films shot in Ladakh
Films directed by Joshiy